Haemaphysalis turturis is a hard-bodied tick of the family Ixodidae. It is found in India and Sri Lanka. It is an obligate ectoparasite of mammals. It is a potential vector of Kyasanur Forest disease virus, and ganjam virus.

References

External links

Epidemiological Study on Ticks in Farm Animals in Selected Areas of Sri Lanka

Ticks
Ixodidae
Arachnids of Asia
Arthropods of India
Arthropods of Sri Lanka
Animals described in 1915